TV Watch may refer to:

 Television Watch coalition, a Charleston, South Carolina
 Seiko TV Watch, a watch with a built-in television made by Seiko; see List of Japanese inventions and discoveries

See also
 The Watch (TV series)
 TX Watch Company